The 1922–23 Southern Branch Cubs men's basketball team represented the Southern Branch of the University of California during the 1922–23 NCAA men's basketball season and were members of the Southern California Intercollegiate Athletic Conference. The cubs were led by second year head coach Pierce "Caddy" Works and played in the women's gym. They finished the regular season with a record of 12–4 and were conference champions with a record of 9–1.

Previous season
The 1921–22 Southern Branch Cubs finished with an official record of 9–1 and won the conference championship under first year coach Caddy Works.

Roster

Schedule

|-
!colspan=9 style=|Regular Season

Source

Notes

References

UCLA Bruins men's basketball seasons
Southern Branch Cubs Basketball
Southern Branch Cubs Basketball
Southern Branch